Idlib District is a district of the Idlib Governorate in northwestern Syria. The administrative centre is the city of Idlib. At the 2004 census, the district had a population of 382,929.

Sub-districts
The district of Idlib is divided into seven sub-districts or nawāḥī (population as of 2004):
Idlib Subdistrict (ناحية ادلب): population 126,284.
Abu al-Duhur Subdistrict (ناحية أبو الظهور): population 38,869.
Binnish Subdistrict (ناحية بنش): population 35,166.
Saraqib Subdistrict (ناحية سراقب): population 88,076.
Taftanaz Subdistrict (ناحية تفتناز): population 24,145.
Maarrat Misrin Subdistrict (ناحية معرتمصرين): population 57,859.
Sarmin Subdistrict (ناحية سرمين): population 14,530.

References

External links

 
Districts of Idlib Governorate